Ajax is a brand of household cleaning products and detergents made by Colgate-Palmolive. The brand is also licensed by Colgate-Palmolive in the United States, Canada and Puerto Rico.

History
 

Colgate-Palmolive introduced Ajax Powdered Cleanser in 1947 as one of the company's first major brands.  Its ingredients include sodium dodecylbenzenesulfonate, sodium carbonate, and quartz.

The Ajax brand was extended to a line of household cleaning products and detergents, which enjoyed its greatest success in the 1960s and beginning of the 1970s. Ajax All Purpose Cleaner with Ammonia, introduced in 1962, was the first major competitor to Procter and Gamble's Mr. Clean (debuted 1958). Ajax's success as the so called "White Tornado" forced Procter and Gamble to introduce its own ammoniated cleaner, Top Job, in 1963. 

Other products by Ajax included Ajax Bucket of Power, an ammoniated power floor cleaner (1963); Ajax Laundry Detergent (1964); and Ajax Window Cleaner with Hex ammonia (1965). The last successful Ajax line extension in North America, Ajax for Dishes (now known as Ajax Dishwashing Liquid) debuted in 1971. 

Currently, Ajax Powdered Cleanser and Ajax Dishwashing Liquid are the only two Ajax products sold by Colgate-Palmolive in the United States. In 2005, Colgate-Palmolive licensed the American and Canadian rights to the Ajax brand name for laundry detergent products. In the same transaction, Colgate-Palmolive also sold its American, Canadian and Puerto Rican laundry products business to Phoenix Brands in 2005. 

Fab & Kind Company currently distributes Ajax and former Colgate laundry detergent brands Fab and Dynamo in the United States.

Advertising and popular culture

The slogan for the original Ajax Powdered Cleanser was "Stronger than dirt!", a reference to the muscular hero Ajax of Greek mythology. The original slogan was also used for Ajax Laundry Detergent for its introduction in the beginning of the 1960s, advertised with an armed knight riding a white horse. 

American actor Eugene Roche gained fame as Ajax man "Squeaky Clean" in many television commercials of the 1970s. In the United Kingdom, character actress Ann Lancaster appeared on television advertisements featuring the slogan "It cleans like a white tornado". Colgate ceased advertising in the United Kingdom for the brand in January 1996.

In the Philippines, actress Lorli Villanueva appeared in television commercials, featuring her character as "Maxima Labandera" in the 1970s. Lito Lapid, Jimmy Santos, Nida Blanca also starred in various Ajax detergent commercials from 1988 to 1992. Blanca's frequent co-star Dolphy was the final brand ambassador of Ajax detergent from 1994 until the product's discontinuation in 2000. 

In Australia, Ajax Spray n' Wipe television commercials appeared from 1988 to 2010, all with the same music based on Ian Dury's song "Billericay Dickie". The ads featured soap opera actress Paula Duncan.

See also 
Biocide
Bon Ami cleanser
 Comet cleanser
 Vim cleanser

References

External links 
 Ajax product page on Colgate consumer website

Cleaning products
Products introduced in 1947
Colgate-Palmolive brands